This article represents the structure of the Albanian Armed Forces as of May 2020:

Chief of the General Staff 
  Chief of the General Staff, in Tirana
 General Staff
 Human Resources Department (J-1)
 Intelligence Department (J-2)
 Operations and Training Department (J-3/7)
 Logistics Department (J-4)
 Defence Planning and Monitoring Department (J-5/8)
 Communications Department (J-6)
 Civil-Military Cooperation Department (J-9)
 Communication and Information System Agency, in Tirana
 Health Inspectorate
  Armed Forces Military Hospital, in Tirana
 Joint Operations Centre, in Tirana
 Personnel Recruitment Centre, in Tirana
 Material Management Centre, in Tirana
 Military Delegation to NATO, in Brussels
 Armed Forces General Staff Support Battalion, in Tirana
 Services Support Company
 Ceremonial Company
 Protection Company
 Transport Support Company
 Armed Forces Band
 Security Section
 Medical Centre
 Military Holiday Homes

Land Force 

  Land Force, in Zall-Herr
 Staff Support Company, in Zall-Herr
 1st Infantry Battalion, in Vau i Dejës
 2nd Infantry Battalion, in Zall-Herr (assigned to NATO Response Force)
 3rd Infantry Battalion, in Poshnjë
 Commando Battalion, in Zall-Herr
 Special Operations Battalion, in Zall-Herr
 Combat Support Battalion, in Zall-Herr
 "Zall-Herr" Garrison, in Zall-Herr
 Training Centre, in Zall-Herr

Air Force 

  Air Force, in Tirana
 Staff Support Company, in Tirana
 Farka Air Base, in Farkë main helicopter base
 Kucove Air Base, in Kuçovë
 Air Surveillance Centre, in Rinas reports to NATO Integrated Air Defense System's CAOC Torrejón at Torrejón Air Base in Spain
 Military Meteorological Service, in Tirana
 Automated weather stations in Farkë, Gjadër, Kuçovë, Kukës, Vlorë, and Gjirokastër

Naval Force 

  Naval Force, in Durrës
 Staff Support Company, in Durrës
 Maritime Fleet, at Pasha Liman Base in Vlorë
 4x Stan 4207 patrol vessels: P 131 Iliria and P 133 Lisus in Durrës, P 132 Oriku and P 134 Butrinti in Vlorë
 numerous smaller units
 Maritime Surveillance Centre, in Durrës
 Diving Centre, at Pasha Liman Base 
 Naval Training Centre, in Durrës
 Hydrographic Service, in Durrës

Training and Doctrine Command 
  Training and Doctrine Command, in Tirana
 Armed Forces Academy, in Tirana
 NCOs Academy, in Tirana
 Troops School, in Vlorë
 Simulation Centre, in Tirana
 Doctrine and Research Centre, in Tirana

Support Command 
  Support Command, in Vaqarr
 Staff Support Company, in Vaqarr 
 Engineer Battalion, in Ferraj
 Command and Staff, Construction Company, Explosive Ordnance Disposal Company, Bridge Company, Support Company
 Supply Battalion, in Pezë Helmës
 Transport Battalion, in Bregu i Lumit
 Regional Support Battalion, in Tirana
 Armed Forces Repair and Maintenance Centre, in Vaqarr
 Armed Forces Central Laboratory, in Ferraj
 Training Centre, in Sauk

Military Police 
  Military Police, in Sauk
 Criminal Police Sector
 Judicial Police Section
 Military Discipline Section
 Vehicle Traffic Inspectorate
 Fire Protection Inspectorate
 1st Military Police Operations Company
 2nd Military Police Operations Company
 Support Company

Armed Forces structure graphic

Geographic distribution of units

References

External links
 Website of the Albanian Armed Forces (English)

Albanian Armed Forces